Joel 3 is the third (and last) chapter of the Book of Joel in the Hebrew Bible or the Old Testament of the Christian Bible. This book contains the prophecies attributed to the prophet Joel from the seventh century BCE, and is a part of the Book of the Twelve Minor Prophets.

Text 
The original text was written in Hebrew language. This chapter is divided into 21 verses.

Textual witnesses
Some early manuscripts containing the text of this chapter in Hebrew are of the Masoretic Text tradition, which includes the Codex Cairensis (895), the Petersburg Codex of the Prophets (916), Aleppo Codex (10th century), Codex Leningradensis (1008).

Fragments cumulatively containing all verses of this chapter were found among the Dead Sea Scrolls, including 4Q78 (4QXIIc; 75–50 BCE) with extant verses 6–21 (4:6–21 in Masoretic Text); 4Q82 (4QXIIg; 25 BCE) with extant verses 4–9, 11–14, 17, 19–20 (4:4–9, 11–14, 17, 19–20 in Masoretic Text); Schøyen MS 4612/1 (DSS F.117; DSS F.Joel1; 50–68 CE) with extant verses 1–4 (4:1–4 in Masoretic Text); and Wadi Murabba'at Minor Prophets (Mur88; MurXIIProph; 75–100 CE) with extant verses 1–16 (3:1–5; 4:1–16 in Masoretic Text).

Ancient manuscripts in Koine Greek containing this chapter are mainly of the Septuagint version, including Codex Vaticanus (B; B; 4th century), Codex Sinaiticus (S; BHK: S; 4th century), Codex Alexandrinus (A; A; 5th century) and Codex Marchalianus (Q; Q; 6th century).

Chapter and verse numbering
The division of chapters and verses in the English Bibles (following Greek translations) differ from the traditional Hebrew text, as follows:

The LORD judges the nations (3:1–16)

Verse 8
And I will sell your sons and your daughters into the hand of the children of Judah,
and they shall sell them to the Sabeans, to a people far off:
for the Lord hath spoken it.
"I will sell your sons and your daughters": The Hebrew expression does not mean "to sell by the hand of," as it is erroneously rendered by some; but "to sell into the hand," that is, to deliver over into the power of the children of Judah. Tyre was taken by Nebuchadnezzar, and then by Greek Alexander the Great, who sold "more than 13,000" of the inhabitants into slavery. Sidon was taken and destroyed by Artaxerxes Ochus, and it is said, above 40,000 of its inhabitants perished in the flames. The like befell the Philistines (see the notes at ). The Persian Artaxerxes Mnemon and Darius Ochus, and chiefly the Greek Alexander, reduced the Phœnician and Philistine powers. Thirty thousand Tyrians after the capture of Tyre by the last conqueror, and multitudes of Philistines on the taking of Gaza, were sold as slaves. 
 "Into the hand of the children of Judah": The Jews are here said to do that which the God of Judah does in vindication of their wrong, namely, sell the Phœnicians who sold them, to a people "far off," as was Greece, whither the Jews had been sold. Kimchi states, "As the Tyrians sold Jewish prisoners to the maritime people of the far West, so the Jews should sell Tyrians to traders of the far East." Benson further elaborates that the Jews were empowered to engage in slave-trading by Alexander the Great, who held favorable relations with them. 
 "The Sabeans": The Sabeans were the inhabitants of Sheba, at the most remote extremity of Arabia Felix are referred to (compare Jeremiah 6:20), a people actively engaged in trade, and related to the Palestinians in the south, as the Grecians in the north. They were a people as far off (or more so) in an easterly direction as the Greeks of Ionia in a westerly; and so Kimchi, "They were far off from their land more than the Javanites (=Grecians)." Sheba is a country by the Jews reckoned the uttermost parts of the earth; see . These are not the same with the Sabeans, the inhabitants of Arabia Deserts, that took away Job's oxen and asses; but rather those who were the inhabitants of Arabia Felix, which lay at a greater distance. So Strabo says, the Sabeans inhabited Arabia Felix; and Diodorus Siculus reckons the Sabeans as very populous, and one of the Arabian nations, who inhabited that Arabia which is called Felix, the metropolis of which is Saba; and he, as well as Strabo, observes, that this country produces many odoriferous plants, as cassia, cinnamon, frankincense, and calamus, or the sweet cane; hence incense is said to come "from Sheba, and the sweet cane from a far country", Jeremiah 6:20; and since the Jews traded with these people for those spices, it is easy to conceive how they sold their captives to them: now these lived at a great distance, in the extreme parts of Arabia, both towards the Indian Sea and the Persian Gulf.

Verse 14
Multitudes, multitudes in the valley of decision!For the day of the Lord is near in the valley of decision.In Christian thinking, the assembly of the multitudes waiting in the Valley of Decision is associated with the second advent of Christ.

Verse 16
 The Lord also will roar from Zion, And utter His voice from Jerusalem; The heavens and earth will shake; But the Lord will be a shelter for His people, And the strength of the children of Israel.Cross reference: 

The victories of the Jews over Antiochus, under the Maccabees, may be a reference of this prophecy; but the ultimate reference is to the last Antichrist, of whom Antiochus was the type. Jerusalem being the central seat of the theocracy, it is from thence that Jehovah discomfits the foe.

"Roar" – as a lion (Amos 1:2). Compare as to Jehovah's voice thundering, ; .

Final Benediction (3:17–21)
The last section contains a 'message of prosperity, happiness, and peace for Judah and Jerusalem', in contrast to 'no hope for the enemies of the people of God'.

Verse 21
 "For I will acquit them of the guilt of bloodshed, whom I had not acquitted; For the Lord dwells in Zion.""I will acquit": follows the Masoretic Text (Hebrew: , veniqqeti).

See also 

 Related Bible parts: Genesis 15, Isaiah 23, Jeremiah 6, Ezekiel 26, Ezekiel 38, Amos 1, Revelation 16

References

Sources

External links 

Jewish translations:
 Yoel – Joel chapter 4 (Judaica Press) translation with Rashi's commentary at Chabad.org
Christian translations:
Online Bible at GospelHall.org (ESV, KJV, Darby, American Standard Version, Bible in Basic English)
  Various versions

03
Phoenicians in the Hebrew Bible